Electraglaia nigrapex is a moth of the family Tortricidae which is endemic to Vietnam.

The ground colour of the forewings is cream mixed with brownish. The base and dorsum are suffused with greyish. The hindwings are grey-brown.

Etymology
The specific name refers to the colouration of the forewing apex and is derived from Latin niger (meaning black).

References

Moths described in 2009
Endemic fauna of Vietnam
Moths of Asia
Archipini
Taxa named by Józef Razowski